Colias electo, the African clouded yellow or lucerne butterfly, is a butterfly of the family Pieridae. It is found in eastern and southern Africa, as well as Arabia. The habitat consists of temperate and montane grasslands.

Adults are on the wing throughout the year, with a peak from April to August.

The larvae feed on Medicago sativa, Trifolium, Vicia and Robinia pseudoacacia.

Subspecies
C. e. electo (South Africa, southern Mozambique, Namibia, Zimbabwe and Zambia)
C. e. hecate Strecker, 1900 (Angola, southern Zaire, northern Zambia and north-western Malawi)
C. e. pseudohecate Berger, 1940 (Malawi, Tanzania, Kenya, Uganda, eastern Zaire, Rwanda, Burundi, southern Sudan, southern Ethiopia and northern Somalia)
C. e. meneliki Berger, 1940 (central and northern Ethiopia and Eritrea)
C. e. philbyi Berger, 1953 (southern and western Arabia)
C. e. manengoubensis Darge, 1968 (eastern Nigeria, Cameroon)

References

Seitz, A. Die Gross-Schmetterlinge der Erde 13: Die Afrikanischen Tagfalter. Plate XIII 22 f

electo
Butterflies of Africa
Butterflies described in 1763
Taxa named by Carl Linnaeus